Helderman Creek is a stream in Cape Girardeau County in the U.S. state of Missouri. It is a tributary of Cane Creek.

Helderman Creek was named after the local Helderman family which emigrated from North Carolina.

See also
List of rivers of Missouri

References

Rivers of Cape Girardeau County, Missouri
Rivers of Missouri